Warlubie  is a village in Świecie County, Kuyavian-Pomeranian Voivodeship, in north-central Poland. It is the seat of the gmina (administrative district) called Gmina Warlubie.

The village has a population of 2,100. Johannes Czerski, one of the founders of German Catholicism, was born in Warlubie.

References

Villages in Świecie County